Holmavatnet or Holmevatnet is a lake in the municipality of Kvam in Vestland county, Norway. The western end of the lake is dammed for purposes of hydroelectric power generation.

See also
List of lakes in Norway

References

Lakes of Vestland
Kvam
Reservoirs in Norway